Czechow may refer to:
Czechów, Lubusz Voivodeship, west Poland
Czechów, Świętokrzyskie Voivodeship, south Poland
the Polish spelling of Chekhov

See also